The Dream of the Celt is a novel written by Peruvian writer and 2010 Nobel laureate in literature Mario Vargas Llosa.  

The novel was presented to the public November 3, 2010 during a special ceremony held in the Casa de América museum and cultural center in Madrid, that same day it appeared in bookstores. It has been a bestseller in Spain and was the most popular title at the XXIV Feria Internacional del Libro de Guadalajara. An English translation by Edith Grossman was published in 2012.

The book is a novelization of the life of Anglo-Irish diplomat and Irish patriot Roger Casement (1864–1916). The title is itself the title of a poem written by the subject. The Nobel Prize committee in announcing Vargas Llosa's selection in the following fashion: "[it is] for his cartography of structures of power and his trenchant images of the individual's resistance, revolt, and defeat," seemed to simultaneously anticipate and chart the author's course in his latest work, while clearly referencing some of his most acclaimed earlier novels.

Though remembered mainly in the Irish context, Roger Casement for a time played an important role in the history of Peru, Vargas Llosa's own country, helping to expose and put an end to terrible exploitation of Native Americans in Peru's Amazon region.

Theme and structure 
The Dream of the Celt combines elements of the historical novel with those of the journalistic chronicle; the main human and historical themes explored are those relating to the colonial subjugation and enslavement (via a process of systematic terror and torture) of the native inhabitants of the Congo Basin and the Peruvian Amazon during the latter part of the 19th and early part of the 20th century. The novel naturally and purposefully invites comparison with Joseph Conrad's Heart of Darkness (the direct appearance of Conrad in the novel leaves little doubt in this regard). 

It is within this larger context that the complex and ultimately tragic story of British consul Roger Casement unfolds. The most notable events of this vita being his birth and childhood in aa Protestant Irish Unionist environment, his earlier admiration for the British Empire and strong belief in the "civilizing mission" of Colonialism, the radical change resulting from his exposure to and his first-hand accounts of the systematic tortures inflicted on the native inhabitants of the Congo and Peru by European commercial concerns; his attainment of a British knighthood for these same humanitarian endeavors; his subsequent transformation into a radical fighter for Irish independence, collaboration with the German military, and participation in the Easter Rising; his arrest, prosecution, and conviction for treason by the British; the late revelations of a submerged history of pederastic activities as per his own secret diaries; his execution by hanging.   

The story is told in alternating chapters, with the odd chapters detailing the last three months of Casement's life (in 1916), and the even chapters encompassing the protagonist's experiences up to that time; the latter are themselves divided into three parts, each one named after a specific colonial geography and reality to which Casement was exposed: "Congo," "Amazonia," "Ireland." Ultimately, odd and even chapters converge on a final structural and dramatic point, which is also the final point (and, in a sense, purpose) of Casement's life. Running through this is the development of Casement's relationship with a prison guard, traumatized by the death of his only son at the Battle  of Loos, who is originally extremely hostile and full of hatred towards the "traitor" Casement. However, gradually this changes into a kind of friendship, the guard sharing with Casement the painful reminiscences of his son and  Casement trying to offer some consolation.

As appears in the earlier flashbacks, Casement's sex life - which he managed to keep secret until brutally exposed by the police - consisted mainly of roaming the night streets of whatever city he was in, and having casual one-time sexual encounters with boys or young men, often for payment. The only time when he seemed to achieve a long term relationship, with the Norwegian Adler Christensen, his lover turned out to be a paid informer for British Intelligence - to Casement's great chagrin. On the other hand, Casement is seen to have several decades-long platonic relationships with women, full of deep love and affection. These women - especially his cousin Gertrude and the historian Alice Stoppard Green - stand by him to the bitter end, making enormous efforts to save him.    

Adding to the plot's dramatic force is the rapidity of Roger Casement's change of allegiance. In 1911, he is still a well-known and highly respected British diplomat. He is entrusted by Foreign Secretary Grey in person with a delicate and dangerous mission; he goes about in Peru as a fully authorized Imperial envoy, with the full power of the British Crown behind him; he goes to the White House for a prolonged meeting with  President Taft, formulating a joint Anglo-American policy towards Peru; and on the successful completion of his mission he gets Knighted, in recognition of his services. A bare three years later, in 1914, Casement has become a radical revolutionary, a sworn enemy of the British Empire, deeply involved in planning an armed uprising, openly and vehemently supporting Britain's German foe and energetically lobbying the Germans to launch a naval attack on British ports. 

As described in the book, already for years before 1911, Casement in fact had become an Irish nationalist and came to regard Ireland, too, as a colony oppressed by Britain, needing and deserving to get free. The crisis in the Peruvian Amazon and the terrible plight of its indigenous population aroused Casement's deep sense of justice  and delayed - but did not prevent - his break with the British Government. Moreover, developments in Ireland after his return from Peru helped radicalize Casement's positions. The Ulster Unionists under Carson openly arming and preparing to prevent by force the implementation of Irish Home Rule - and being supported in this by significant elements of the British ruling class and by officers of the British Army - led Casement, like many other Irish people, to the conclusion that Britain would never peacefully grant Ireland the long-promised autonomy. Rather, the only way for Ireland to get free was by armed insurrection - and for the insurrection to succeed, it needed the support of a rival great Power, i.e. Germany. Vargas needed to invent nothing for this dramatic change - the rapid change in Casement's stance is a well-attested and documented historical fact.   

Parallel with Casement's political change, and closely related to it, is a religious change - from a rather indifferent Protestant to an increasingly devout Catholic. As noted in the earlier chapters, Casement's mother, though she formally converted to Protestantism in order to marry his father, in fact remained a practicing Catholic, attending Catholic prayers and mass and secretly having her son Roger undergo Catholic baptism when he was four years old. However, in his years of service to the British government Casement had no inclination to take up his mother's religion. But after 1912, Protestantism in Ireland became increasingly identified with Unionism - making Casement alienated from it. After a period of trying to rally the minority of Irish Protestants opposed to Carson's Unionism, and organizing one credible public meeting of such Protestants in Belfast, Casement became altogether fed up with being a Protestant, and increasingly attracted to the Catholic Church. Also the involvement of Catholic clergy in supporting the exploited Peruvian indigenous tribes - including both Peruvian Priests and Irish monks who undertook a Mission in Peru at Casement's request - helped draw him closer to their Church. The process was completed under the influence of two sensitive and generous Catholic Priests that Casement met in moments of deep crisis. The first one, an exile Irish priest in Germany, helped Casement over the bitter disappointment of being violently repudiated by Irish soldiers of the British Army, held in POW camps in Germany and rejecting out of hand Casement's offer to join an Irish Brigade fighting on the side of Germany. The second Catholic Priest was in Pentonville Prison, offering consolation to Casement when facing imminent execution and assuring him that "there was no question of a conversion". In the eyes of the Church, Casement's childhood baptism remained valid, and he had always been a Catholic, "at the will of the mother who loved him"; becoming an openly practicing Catholic would simply be "returning to the home which had always been his". On the morning of his execution, Casement undergoes the Catholic Mass for the first and last time in his life, and goes calmly to the gallows immediately afterwards.

References

External links
Times Literary Supplement review 
The Guardian article 1 
The Guardian article 2 
Alfaguara, Spanish publisher 

2010 novels
Belgian Congo in fiction
Novels by Mario Vargas Llosa